{{DISPLAYTITLE:C6H15N}}
The molecular formula C6H15N (molar mass: 101.19 g/mol, exact mass: 101.1204 u) may refer to:

 Diisopropylamine
 1,3-Dimethylbutylamine (1,3-DMBA)
 Dipropylamine
 Hexylamine
 Triethylamine